Two classes of British Royal Navy gunboats have been named Albacore-class gunboats:

 , a class of 98 gunboats built for use in the Crimean War
 , a class of three composite screw gunboats

Ship classes of the Royal Navy